"Boyfriend" is a song from Japanese singer Mai Kuraki and American singer-songwriter Michael Africk, taken from Kuraki's ninth studio album Future Kiss.

Live performances
Kuraki performed the song at Happy Happy Halloween Live: Mai Kuraki Live Tour 2009 "Best" on October 31, 2009 at Nippon Budokan, along with Michael Africk.

Usage in media
The song was featured in the commercial for Japanese cosmetic brand KOSÉ's Esprique Precious collection.

References

2010 songs
Mai Kuraki songs
Songs written by Rodney Jerkins